Plymouth Township, Ohio may refer to:

Plymouth Township, Ashtabula County, Ohio
Plymouth Township, Richland County, Ohio

Ohio township disambiguation pages